Robert MacNaughton is an American actor. He is best known for his role as Elliott's brother Michael in E.T. the Extra-Terrestrial, for which he won a 1982 Young Artist Award as Best Young Supporting Actor in a Motion Picture. MacNaughton also played the lead role of Adam Farmer in the 1983 film I Am the Cheese, based on the young adult novel by Robert Cormier.

Biography 
Born in New York City, MacNaughton primarily worked in the theater, both before and after E.T., performing with the Circle Repertory Company, where he originated the role of Buddy Layman in Jim Leonard Jr.'s The Diviners. MacNaughton performed with Kevin Kline in Henry V at the New York Shakespeare Festival in Central Park. He played Hally in Athol Fugard's "Master Harold"...and the Boys for South Coast Repertory, and has also performed with the Long Wharf Theater and Seattle Repertory, among many others. His television appearances include Dennis Potter's Visitors for the BBC, Vietnam War Story for HBO, Newhart, and Amen, among other television films.

MacNaughton retired from acting in 2002. He then worked as a mail handler at the bulk facilities in Phoenix, Arizona, and Jersey City, New Jersey. In 2013, MacNaughton returned to acting, performing in two films, Kamal Ahmed's Laugh Killer Laugh (co-starring his wife, Bianca Hunter) and Damien Leone's Frankenstein vs. The Mummy.

MacNaughton is married to actress Bianca Hunter.

Filmography

Accolades

References

External links 
 

Living people
20th-century American male actors
21st-century American male actors
American male child actors
American male film actors
American male television actors
Male actors from New York (state)
Year of birth missing (living people)